The Martin Creek Mountains are a mountain range in Humboldt County, Nevada.

References 

Mountain ranges of Nevada
Mountain ranges of Humboldt County, Nevada